Patricia Widlitz (born July 30, 1945) is an American politician who served in the Connecticut House of Representatives from the 98th district from 1995 to 2015.

References

1945 births
Living people
Democratic Party members of the Connecticut House of Representatives
Women state legislators in Connecticut
People from Middletown, Connecticut
20th-century American politicians
20th-century American women politicians
21st-century American politicians
21st-century American women politicians